These are tables of congressional delegations from Minnesota to the United States House of Representatives and the United States Senate.

The current dean of the Minnesota delegation is Representative Betty McCollum (MN-4), having served in the House since 2001.

U.S. House of Representatives

Current members

The House delegation has 8 members, including 4 Democrats, and 4 Republicans.

List of representatives

Delegates from Minnesota Territory

Representatives from Minnesota

1858–1883

1883–1903

1903–1933

1933–present

United States Senate

Key

See also

List of United States congressional districts
Minnesota's congressional districts
Political party strength in Minnesota

References 

 
 
Minnesota
Politics of Minnesota
Congressional delegations